Giuseppe Basile (1 December 1886, San Filippo del Mela - 24 January 1977) was an Italian politician. He was elected member of the Chamber of Deputies in 1948. He represented the Monarchist National Party from 1948 to 1958 and the Italian Democratic Party of Monarchist Unity from 1963 to 1968.

References

1886 births
1977 deaths
Politicians from the Province of Messina
Monarchist National Party politicians
Italian Democratic Party of Monarchist Unity politicians
Deputies of Legislature I of Italy
Deputies of Legislature II of Italy
Deputies of Legislature IV of Italy
Italian military personnel of World War I